Sisurcana procidua is a species of moth of the family Tortricidae. It is found in Ecuador (Morona-Santiago Province, Zamora-Chinchipe Province) and Peru.

References

Moths described in 2004
Sisurcana
Moths of South America
Taxa named by Józef Razowski